Gene Teague (born December 2, 1989) is an American professional basketball player for Kharkivski Sokoly in the Ukrainian Basketball Superleague.

Early life
Teague was born in Brooklyn, New York.

College career

Club career
In September 2019, Teague signed with Kharkivski Sokoly of the Ukrainian Basketball Superleague.

References

1989 births
Living people
American expatriate basketball people in Ukraine
American men's basketball players
Basketball players from New York City
Centers (basketball)
BC Kharkivski Sokoly players